Herbert Trenchard Richardson (November 25, 1903 – January 17, 1982) was a Canadian rower who competed in the 1928 Summer Olympics. In 1928 he won the bronze medal as member of the Canadian boat in the eights competition.

He was born in Toronto.

References

External links
profile

1903 births
1982 deaths
Rowers from Toronto
Canadian male rowers
Olympic rowers of Canada
Rowers at the 1928 Summer Olympics
Olympic bronze medalists for Canada
Olympic medalists in rowing
Medalists at the 1928 Summer Olympics